This is presenting a complete list in alphabetical order of cricketers who have played for South Zone in first-class, List A or Twenty20 matches since the team was formed ahead of the 2012–13 season for the first Bangladesh Cricket League (BCL) competition. South Zone is a composite regional team which combines two divisional teams, Barisal and Khulna. Complying with other team lists, details are the player's name followed by his years active as a South Zone player, current players to the end of the 2015–16 season.

A
 Abdur Razzak (2012–13 to 2015–16)
 Al-Amin Hossain (2013–14 to 2014–15)
 Anamul Haque (2012–13 to 2015–16)
 Asif Hasan (2015–16)

E
 Enamul Haque (2014–15 to 2015–16)

F
 Farhad Reza (2015–16)
 Fazle Mahmud (2012–13 to 2015–16)

I
 Imrul Kayes (2012–13 to 2015–16)

K
 Kamrul Islam Rabbi (2012–13)

M
 Mashrafe Mortaza (2014–15)
 Mehedi Hasan (2015–16)
 Mohammad Mithun Ali (2012–13 to 2015–16)
 Mosaddek Hossain (2014–15 to 2015–16)
 Moynul Islam (2015–16)
 Murad Khan (2012–13)
 Mustafizur Rahman (2013–14 to 2014–15)

N
 Nazmul Hossain (2015–16)
 Nazmul Islam (2013–14)
 Nurul Hasan (2014–15)

R
 Robiul Islam (2012–13 to 2015–16)
 Rubel Hossain (2012–13 to 2014–15)

S
 Saikat Ali (2014–15)
 Shafaq Al Zabir (2012–13)
 Shahriar Nafees (2014–15 to 2015–16)
 Shuvagata Hom (2013–14)
 Sohag Gazi (2012–13 to 2015–16)
 Soumya Sarkar (2012–13 to 2014–15)

T
 Taibur Rahman (2013–14 to 2015–16)
 Taposh Ghosh (2012–13)
 Towhidul Islam (2015–16)
 Tushar Imran (2012–13 to 2015–16)

Z
 Ziaur Rahman (2012–13 to 2015–16)

References

South Zone